Hans-Christof Kraus (born 3 November 1958) is a German historian.

Life 
Born in Göttingen, Kraus studied history, German literature and philosophy at the Georg-August-Universität Göttingen from 1978 to 1984. In the 1980s he was editor of the Young Conservatives Phoenix magazine.

In 1992 he submitted his dissertation on the Prussian conservative Ernst Ludwig von Gerlach in the subject of modern history to Rudolf von Thadden. In 2002 after his habilitation, he studied at the Ludwig-Maximilians-Universität München with the topic English constitution and political thought in the Ancien Régime 1689-1789. The work was reviewed by Horst Möller, Eckhart Hellmuth and Hans-Michael Körner.

Kraus' work and research focuses on German and English history of the 18th to 20th century, the history of politics, Constitutional History, political History of Ideas, as well as the history of education and science. For his research Kraus has been awarded numerous scientific honours and memberships.

Writings 
Monographs
 Der Wendepunkt des Philosophen von Sanssouci. Duncker & Humblot, Berlin 2017, .
 Bismarck. Größe – Grenzen – Leistungen. Klett-Cotta, Stuttgart 2015, .
 Versailles und die Folgen. Außenpolitik zwischen Revisionismus und Verständigung (1919–1933) (Deutsche Geschichte im 20. Jahrhundert. Vol. 4). Be.bra-Verlag, Berlin-Brandenburg 2013,  (Als Lizenzausgabe: (Bundeszentrale für Politische Bildung. Schriftenreihe. 1540). Bundeszentrale für politische Bildung, Bonn 2014).
 Kultur, Bildung und Wissenschaft im 19. Jahrhundert (. Vol. 82). Oldenbourg, München 2008, .
 Das Ende des alten Deutschland. Krise und Auflösung des Heiligen Römischen Reiches Deutscher Nation 1806 (Wissenschaftliche Abhandlungen und Reden zur Philosophie, Politik und Geistesgeschichte. Vol. 37). Duncker & Humblot, Berlin 2006,  (2nd revised edition; id. 2007).
 Englische Verfassung und politisches Denken im Ancien Régime. 1689 bis 1789 (Veröffentlichungen des Deutschen Historischen Instituts London. Vol. 60). Oldenbourg, Munich 2006,  (in the same time, University of Munich, Habilitation thesis, 2001/2002).
 Theodor Anton Heinrich Schmalz. (1760–1831). Jurisprudenz, Universitätspolitik und Publizistik im Spannungsfeld von Revolution und Restauration (Studien zur europäischen Rechtsgeschichte. Vol. 124). Klostermann, Frankfurt 1999, .
 Ernst Ludwig von Gerlach. Politisches Denken und Handeln eines preußischen Altkonservativen (Schriftenreihe der Historischen Kommission bei der Bayerischen Akademie der Wissenschaften. Vol. 53). 2 volumes. Vandenhoeck und Ruprecht, Göttingen 1994,  (in the same time: University of Göttingen, Dissertation, 1992).

As editor
 Fritz Hartung. Korrespondenz eines Historikers zwischen Kaiserreich und zweiter Nachkriegszeit. Duncker und Humblot, Berlin 2019, .
 Ernst Ludwig von Gerlach: Gottesgnadentum und Freiheit. Ausgewählte politische Schriften aus den Jahren 1863 bis 1866. Herausgegeben und mit einem Nachwort versehen. Karolinger, Vienna among others 2011, .
 Konservative Politiker in Deutschland. Eine Auswahl biographischer Porträts aus zwei Jahrhunderten. Duncker und Humblot, Berlin 1995, .

References

External links 
 
 
 
 
 Seite von Hans-Christof Kraus an der Universität Passau
 Hans-Christof Kraus at 

1958 births
Living people
Writers from Göttingen
20th-century German historians
21st-century German historians
Academic staff of the University of Stuttgart
German editors